Michael Osmar Godoy Núñez (born 17 July 1983) is a Paraguayan footballer.

He played for clubs like Cerro Porteño, Olimpia and Universidad de Concepción.

References
 

1983 births
Living people
People from Caacupé
Paraguayan footballers
Paraguayan expatriate footballers
Universidad de Concepción footballers
Cobresal footballers
Club Olimpia footballers
Cerro Porteño players
Sportivo Luqueño players
Expatriate footballers in Chile
Chilean Primera División players
Association football defenders